The Western Approaches Museum in Liverpool, England, is a museum chronicling the work of Western Approaches Command around Atlantic convoys, combating the U-boat menace and the Battle of the Atlantic. Set in the restored former Second World War command centre responsible for coordinating the effort, the museum consists of re-opened rooms housing artefacts from when the command centre was in active use.

The museum includes a tour that covers the Central Operations room, cypher room, a 1940s street scene, NAAFI canteen and community classroom facility. It also contains the original Gaumont Kalee Dragon projector which Winston Churchill used to watch secret war footage.

Since September 2017, the museum has been run by a social enterprise group, Big Heritage. Since taking over, Big Heritage has undertaken a restoration of the site, unearthing artefacts and parts of the facility that had been closed off since the 1960s. The museum now hosts a special exhibition entitles "The Arctic Convoys - A Shared History" and an exhibition dedicated to the women of the WRNS (Women's Royal Naval Service).

Entry price to the museum includes 12 months of unlimited returns and there are concessions available. Children under the age of 16 are free. Regular holiday activities and events are available and are normally included in the admission cost.

References

External links

Western Approaches

History museums in Merseyside
Local museums in Merseyside
Museums in Liverpool